Itinerary or Itineraries or Itinerarium may refer to:

Travel
 Itinerarium, an Ancient Roman road map in the form of a listing of cities, villages, and other stops, with the intervening distances
 Itinerarium Burdigalense, also known as the Itinerarium Hierosolymitanum ("Jerusalem Itinerary"), the oldest Christian road map in the form of a listing of cities, villages, and other stops with the intervening distances
 Antonine Itinerary, a famous register of the stations and distances along various roads within the Roman Empire
 Travel itinerary, a schedule of intended destinations and activities for travelers
 Itineraries, or travel literature, travel journals and diaries
 Itineraries of the Roman emperors, 337–361
 Itinerary, the route of a road trip, or the proposed outline of one
 Itinerary, the route of a tour or the proposed outline of one
 Itinerary, a route of travel, or the proposed outline such
 Itinerary, or travel plan, a package of actions designed by an organisation to encourage safe, healthy and sustainable travel options

Arts, entertainment, and media
Itinerary (album), a 1991 album by saxophonist Steve Lacy
 Itinerary of a Spoiled Child, a French film directed by Claude Lelouch in 1988

Other uses
 Itinerary, a sequence of symbols in symbolic dynamics
 Itinerary, or schedule, a time-management tool
 Itinerary file, a file format designed as an itinerary data format for TomTom devices

See also 
 Guide book, a book of information about a place, designed for the use of visitors or tourists
 Trip planner, a website dedicated to helping the users plan their trips